The 2008 Primera B de Chile was the 58th completed season of the Primera B de Chile.

Curicó Unido — tournament’s champion — reached its first ever promotion to top-tier in its 35-year existence, whilst the second promoted was Deportes Iquique after beating Coquimbo Unido in the promotion playoffs. Nevertheless Arturo Fernández Vial was relegated to the Tercera División following 26 years at the professionalism.

Table

See also
Chilean football league system

References

External links
 RSSSF 2008

Primera B de Chile seasons
Primera B
Chil